The 1924 Furman Purple Hurricane football team was an American football team that represented Furman University as a member of the Southern Intercollegiate Athletic Association (SIAA) during the 1924 college football season. In their tenth season under head coach Billy Laval, Furman compiled an overall record of 5–5 with a mark of 1–2 in SIAA play.

Schedule

References

Furman
Furman Paladins football seasons
Furman Purple Hurricane football